Sketchorama was a radio show, a product of The Comedy Unit, commissioned by the BBC for Radio 4. It featured a rotating cast of comedic sketch groups who performed in front of a live audience. The groups were introduced by a host comedian, originally Humphrey Ker, then Thom Tuck. The show stopped airing in 2015 after its fourth season. The British Comedy Guide describes it as "a format for Radio 4 which offers the same popular showcase dynamic as stand-up shows, but purely for comedy sketch groups. Sketchorama aimed to bring hidden gems and established live acts to the airwaves offering a truly distinctive and ambitious show."

Episodes

Series 1

Episode One aired June 26, 2012. Humphrey Ker presented sketch groups Delete the Banjax, Lady Garden and Idiots of Ants.

Episode Two aired July 3, 2012. Humphrey Ker presented sketch groups Noise Next Door, the Boom Jennies and Jigsaw.

Episode Three aired July 10, 2012. Humphrey Ker presented sketch groups Three Englishmen, Max and Ivan, and Frisky and Mannish.

Series 2

Episode One aired April 29, 2013. Thom Tuck presented the Beta Males, Shirley & Shirley, and Jonny & the Baptists.

Episode Two aired May 6, 2013. Thom Tuck presented So On and So Forth, That Pair and Sheeps.

Episode Three aired May 13, 2013. Thom Tuck presented sketch groups McNeill & Pamphilon, Barbershopera and Wittank.

Episode Four aired May 20, 2013. It was not a standard episode; Thom Tuck served as host, but the show consisted of a reunion of sketch group Absolutely, supported by Glaswegian sketch group Endemic. The episode won a BBC Audio Drama Award for best live audience comedy.

Series 3

Episode One aired June 23, 2014. Thom Tuck presented Casual Violence, Croft & Pearce and Beasts.

Episode Two aired June 30, 2014. Thom Tuck presented Mixed Doubles, The Real MacGuffins and Bob & Jim.

Episode Three aired July 7, 2014. Thom Tuck presented Birthday Girls, The Jest and Four Screws Loose.

Episode Four aired August 2014. Thom Tuck presented The Colour Ham, Lead Pencil and Foil, Arms & Hog. It was recorded at the Edinburgh Fringe Festival.

On 27 December 2014 an hour-long episode entitled Sketchorama Extra was broadcast, featuring sketches from acts in Series 3 that had not made it into the main episodes.

Making of
Producer Gus Beattie began the show after noticing there were multiple shows about up-and-coming comedians, but none showcasing sketch talent. Beattie chooses which sketch groups will perform on the show. He finds many of these groups at the Edinburgh Festival and online. The chosen groups gather at the Royal Academy of Dramatic Art to perform before a live audience.

How to listen
Clips and select episodes are available on the BBC's website, YouTube and Sketchorama's Facebook page.

Additional resources
In addition to its spot on the BBC website, Sketchorama has a Facebook page, a Twitter hashtag, a page on The Comedy Unit's website, a page on the British Comedy Guide's website and a programme guide on the Radio Times website. It also features prominently on Gus Beattie's YouTube channel.

References

BBC Radio 4 Extra programmes